Caroline Wozniacki was the defending champion, but lost in the semifinals to Julia Görges.
Agnieszka Radwańska won the title, defeating Görges 7–5, 6–4 in the final.

Seeds

Draw

Finals

Top half

Bottom half

Qualifying

Seeds

Qualifiers

Lucky loser
  Polona Hercog
  Casey Dellacqua

Draw

First qualifier

Second qualifier

Third qualifier

Fourth qualifier

External links
 WTA tournament draws

Dubai Tennis Championships - Singles
2012 Dubai Tennis Championships